Ceyco Georgia Zefanya (born 24 June 1999) is an Indonesian karateka. She is a three-time silver medalist at the Southeast Asian Games.

She competed in the women's kumite 68 kg event at the 2018 Asian Games held in Jakarta, Indonesia without winning a medal. She was eliminated in her first match by Nguyễn Thị Ngoan of Vietnam.

At the 2018 Asian Karate Championships held in Amman, Jordan, she won one of the bronze medals in the women's kumite 68 kg event. The following year, at the 2019 Asian Karate Championships held in Tashkent, Uzbekistan, she won the silver medal in the women's kumite 68 kg event. This became the gold medal after a confirmed doping violation of Nodira Djumaniyazova of Uzbekistan, the original gold medalist.

In June 2021, she competed at the World Olympic Qualification Tournament held in Paris, France hoping to qualify for the 2020 Summer Olympics in Tokyo, Japan. She was eliminated in her second match. In November 2021, she competed in the women's 68 kg event at the World Karate Championships held in Dubai, United Arab Emirates.

She won the silver medal in her event at the 2021 Southeast Asian Games held in Hanoi, Vietnam. She also won the silver medal in the women's team kumite event.

She won one of the bronze medals in her event at the 2022 Asian Karate Championships held in Tashkent, Uzbekistan.

Achievements

References 

Living people
1999 births
Place of birth missing (living people)
Indonesian female karateka
Karateka at the 2018 Asian Games
Asian Games competitors for Indonesia
Southeast Asian Games silver medalists for Indonesia
Southeast Asian Games medalists in karate
Competitors at the 2019 Southeast Asian Games
Competitors at the 2021 Southeast Asian Games
21st-century Indonesian women